Spain is scheduled to compete at the 2019 European Games, in Minsk, Belarus from 21 to 30 June 2019. As of 28 May 2019, the Spanish Olympic Committee has selected 150 athletes to compete at the games.

Medalists

Archery

Recurve

Compound

Athletics

Track events

Field events

Badminton

Basketball 3x3

Beach soccer

Summary

Boxing

Men

Women

Canoe sprint

Men

Women

Cycling

Track 

Sprint

Team sprint

Keirin

Time Trial

Omnium

Madison

Endurance

Gymnastics

Acrobatic

Aerobic
Mixed

Artistic
Men
All-Around

Women
All-Around

Rhythmic

Trampoline

Judo

Men

Women

Mixed team

Karate

Sambo

Men

Women

Shooting

Men

Women

Mixed

Table tennis

Wrestling

Men's freestyle

Women's freestyle

References

Nations at the 2019 European Games
European Games
2019